The North Wales International Music Festival is a classical music festival founded by William Mathias in 1972 and held annually in St Asaph Cathedral in north Wales. William Mathias was Artistic Director of the Festival for twenty years. He was followed by Geraint Lewis and the role is currently held by Ann Atkinson.
The Festival is an eight-day event (nine days 2013) and takes place in the last week of September each year.

The President of the North Wales International Music Festival is Bishop Gregory Cameron Bishop of St. Asaph. Vice Presidents are Professor Paul Mealor and Dr. Rhiannon Mathias,  the Chair is the Very Reverend Nigel Williams, Dean of the Cathedral, and the Vice Chair is Sue Last.

External links
 North Wales International Music Festival Official Website

Music festivals established in 1972
Classical music festivals in the United Kingdom
1972 establishments in Wales
Tourist attractions in Denbighshire
Music festivals in Wales
St Asaph
Autumn events in Wales